Prospect Hill is a small town in the southern Adelaide Hills of South Australia, Its major industries are forestry in Kuitpo Forest and dairy farming. There are also mountain bike trails in the area.

Prospect Hill was severely impacted by the Ash Wednesday bushfires in 1983. The town lost 16 houses, the scout hall and CWA hall.

References

Towns in South Australia